Mokoena is a South African surname. Notable people by that name include:

 Aaron Mokoena (born 1980), South African footballer.
 Fana Mokoena (born 1971), South African actor.
Godfrey Khotso Mokoena (born 1985), South African athlete.
Nthabiseng Mokoena, South African intersex activist.
Nthabiseng Mokoena (archaeologist), Lesotho archaeologist
Ntsopa Mokoena (born 2004), South Africa field hockey player
Thapelo Mokoena, South African actor.

See also
The River (South African TV series), The Mokoena family, consisting of Malefu Mokoena and her children, Thuso, Dimpho and Itumeleng, live in Refilwe.

Sotho-language surnames
South African families